Clubul Sportiv Balotești, commonly known as CS Balotești or simply as Balotești, is a Romanian football club from Balotești, Ilfov County founded in 2006. They currently play in the Liga IV – Ilfov County, the fourth tier of the Romanian football league system.

At the end of the 2013–14 Liga III season, the team gained promotion to Liga II, for the first time in their history.

History
CS Balotești was founded in 2006 and played in Liga IV until the summer of 2010 when the club obtained a place in Liga III despite the fact that it failed to promote.

In Liga III the team from Balotești had good results, never ending below 6th place and promoted at the end of 2013–14 season to Liga II.

First season of Liga II was a tough one for the club, especially because of the low budget, but it managed to achieve its goal by salvation from the relegation. 2015–16 was again a tough one but the team managed to win the relegation play-outs, ensuring a seat in Liga II for another year. 2016–17 season was also a very difficult one, because Liga II went to a single series with 20 teams. Some of them withdrew ongoing, but CS Balotești resisted both financially and sporty, ending on an honorable 13th place.

Honours
Liga III
Winners (1): 2013–14
Runners-up (1): 2012–13

Club Officials

Board of directors

Current technical staff

League history

References

External links
 

 
Sport in Ilfov County
Football clubs in Ilfov County
Association football clubs established in 2006
Liga II clubs
Liga III clubs
Liga IV clubs